Don't Quote Me was a television panel game produced by Open Media and transmitted by Channel 4 in 1990.  It was hosted by Geoffrey Perkins, who said "The show exploits foot in mouth quotes. Those things that people have said that perhaps now they wish they hadn't".

List of episodes

Here follows a complete list of all editions, with first transmission dates and the names of all the guests.

References

Channel 4 original programming
British non-fiction television series
British political comedy television series
1990 British television series debuts
1990 British television series endings
1990s British game shows
English-language television shows
Channel 4 comedy
Channel 4 panel games